Jorys Mène (born 2 January 1995) is a New Caledonian footballer who plays as a defender for Alisontia Steinsel. He made his debut for the New Caledonia on 12 November 2016 in their 2–0 loss against New Zealand.

References

External links
 

Living people
1995 births
Association football defenders
New Caledonia international footballers
New Caledonian footballers
Francs Borains players